Romania competed at the 1972 Winter Olympics in Sapporo, Japan.

Alpine skiing

Men

Men's slalom

Biathlon

Men

 1 One minute added per close miss (a hit in the outer ring), two minutes added per complete miss.

Men's 4 x 7.5 km relay

 2 A penalty loop of 200 metres had to be skied per missed target.

Bobsleigh

Figure skating

Men

References
Official Olympic Reports 
 Olympic Winter Games 1972, full results by sports-reference.com

Nations at the 1972 Winter Olympics
1972
1972 in Romanian sport